Ivita Krūmiņa (born 19 September 1981) is a Latvian ice hockey player, currently playing with the Latvian national team and SHK Laima Rīga of the Optibet Baltic Women's Ice-hockey Championship (OBWIC).

References

External links
 

Latvian women's ice hockey players
Latvian ice hockey players
1981 births
Living people